Mary Paulet, Lady Cromwell ( – 10 October 1592) was an English noblewoman, the daughter of John Paulet, 2nd Marquess of Winchester of Basing, Hampshire and his first wife Elizabeth, daughter of Robert Willoughby, 2nd Baron Willoughby de Broke by his second wife, Dorothy, daughter of Thomas Grey, 1st Marquess of Dorset.

Marriages and issue
Mary Paulet married, before 1560, Henry Cromwell, 2nd Baron Cromwell, (1538 – 20 November 1592), the son of her father's second wife, Elizabeth Seymour, and her second husband, Gregory Cromwell, 1st Baron Cromwell, and had issue: 
 Edward Cromwell, 3rd Baron Cromwell,  (c. 1560 – 27 April 1607), married firstly, Elizabeth Upton (died 1592/3), of Puslinch, Devon and secondly, Frances Rugge, (died 1631) of Felmingham, Norfolk, by whom he had a son, Thomas Cromwell, 1st Earl of Ardglass and two daughters, Frances and Anne. He served with the Earl of Essex in the expedition against Spain and was knighted by him in Dublin 12 July 1599. 
 Sir Gregory Cromwell, married Frances, daughter of Sir Edward Griffin of Dingley, Northamptonshire. Knighted by James I in 1603.
 Katharine Cromwell (d. 24 March 1621), married on 10 February 1581 at North Elmham, Norfolk, Sir Lionel Tollemache, 1st Baronet (1562 - 1612), of Helmingham, Suffolk, son of Sir Lionel Tollemache and Susan Jermyn. They had a son, Sir Lionel Tollemache, 2nd Baronet.

Death
Mary died at North Elmham, Norfolk, 10 October 1592, and was buried, on 23 October, at Launde Abbey, Leicestershire. Henry Cromwell died soon after his wife, on 20 November at North Elmham, Norfolk, 1592 and was buried, on 4 December, at Launde Abbey.

References

Bibliography
 
 
 
  at HathiTrust
 
 
 
 
 
 
 
 
 
 
 

1540 births
Year of birth uncertain
1592 deaths
16th-century English women
Daughters of British marquesses
Cromwell
Mary
People from North Elmham